The economy of Eritrea has experienced considerable growth in recent years, indicated by an improvement in gross domestic product in 2012 of 7.5% over 2011, and has a total of $8.090 billion as of 2020. However, worker remittances from abroad are estimated to account for 32 percent of gross domestic product. Eritrea has an extensive amount of resources such as copper, gold, granite, marble, and potash. The Eritrean economy has undergone extreme changes due to the War of Independence.

In 2011, Eritrea's GDP grew by 8.7 percent making it one of the fastest growing economies in the world.

Economic history
Eritrea's recent growth performance has been marked by significant volatility in part due to its dependence on a predominantly rain-fed agriculture sector, accounting for about one-third of the economy and which has a significant impact on distribution services which account for around 20% of gross domestic product (GDP), and on a narrow mining sector which also accounts for 20% of the economy. Real GDP growth is estimated to have recovered to around 12% in 2018, while averaging -2.7% during 2015–18 on account of frequent droughts and a decline in mining production.

Reported inflation has been negative during 2016–18, following the exchange of currency in circulation in November 2015 that resulted in a monetary contraction. Deflation continued in 2018 as increased trade with Ethiopia resulted in further put downward pressure on prices.

In recent years, Eritrea has significantly tightened fiscal policy to reverse the chronic deficits it suffered after the increase in regional insecurity in 1998. In 2018, the fiscal surplus widened to around 11% of GDP. This was largely achieved by a sharp drop in capital spending as well as some revenue measures. However, fiscal pressures, both recurrent and wage-related are likely to mount.

Short-term growth prospects remain challenging given fiscal constraints and limited opportunities under existing restrictions. The recovery in agriculture is expected to slow. The country remains in a difficult macroeconomic situation with an unsustainable debt burden (including arrears to the World Bank) and vulnerable financial and external sectors.

Gross domestic product (GDP)

Eritrea's GDP, estimated at $4.037 billion in 2011, is 8.7 percent above the GDP in 2010. The growth was due to increased agricultural output and the expansion of the mining industry along with increasing gold prices. Breakdowns of the Eritrean economy by sector are not readily available; however, according to some estimates, in 2011 services accounted for 55 percent of the GDP, industry for 34 percent, and agriculture for the remaining 11 percent. The growth of the GDP, however, is compromised by the ongoing and tensions with the country's borders.

Industries

Agriculture, Forestry, and Fishing

In 2004, agriculture employed nearly 80 percent of the population but accounted for only 12.4 percent of gross domestic product (GDP) in Eritrea. The agricultural sector has improved with the use of modern farming equipment and techniques, and dams. Nevertheless, it is compromised by a lack of financial services and investment. Major agricultural products are sorghum, barley, beans, dairy products, lentils, meat, millet, leather, teff, and wheat. The displacement of 1 million Eritreans as a result of the war with Ethiopia, and the widespread presence of land mines all have played a role in the declining productivity of the agricultural sector. Currently, almost a quarter of the country's most productive land remains unoccupied because of the lingering effects of the 1998–2000 war with Ethiopia.

Forestry is not a significant economic activity in Eritrea.

The government is encouraging large-scale cultivation of cactus to help alleviate the human suffering and, in the future, increase export revenues. Cactus plants are said to have been introduced in 1839 by a French catholic missionary who planted the cactus in Digsa, Akrur and Hebo, Southern region. The second generation cactus plants were introduced by the Italians, who planted them at Arberebu while they were building the Asmara rail lines.

Reliable figures on the extent and value of the fishing industry in Eritrea are difficult to obtain. However, Eritrea's long coastline offers the opportunity for significant expansion of the fishing industry from its current, largely artisanal, stage. Eritrea exports fish and sea cucumbers from the Red Sea to markets in Europe and Asia, and there is hope that the construction of a new, jet-capable airport in Massawa, as well as rehabilitation of the port there, may support increased exports of high-value seafood. In 2002, exports were about 14,000 tons, but the maximum stable yield is thought to be nearly 80,000 tons. A fish processing plant was built in 1998 that now exports 150 tons of frozen fish every month to markets in Britain, Germany, and the Netherlands. Tensions with Yemen over fishing rights in the Red Sea flared up in 1995 and again in 2002, and Eritrea's difficult relations with other nations could hamper further development of the industry.

Mining and minerals
Eritrea's substantial mineral deposits are largely unexplored. According to the Eritrean government, artisanal mining in 1998 collected 573.4 kilograms of gold, however the number of gold reserves is unknown. International observers also have noted Eritrea's excellent potential for quarrying ornamental marble and granite. As of 2001, some 10 mining companies had obtained licenses to prospect for different minerals in Eritrea. The government of Eritrea reportedly is in the process of conducting a geological survey for use by potential investors in the mining sector. The presence of hundreds of thousands of land mines in Eritrea, particularly along the border with Ethiopia, presents a serious impediment to future development of the mining sector.

Nevsun Resources completed construction of its Bisha mining project in 2011. Estimated production will be 350,000 ounces of gold per year until the gold ore is exhausted, at which point the mine will produce copper and zinc.

Industry and Manufacturing
During the period of federation, industrial capacity largely shifted to Ethiopia, leaving the Eritrean industrial sector with outmoded capital equipment. In 2003 industry accounted for 25.3 percent of gross domestic product. Major products include processed food and dairy products, alcoholic beverages, glass, leather goods, marble, textiles, and salt.

Energy

Households consume more than 80 percent of total energy production. Electricity production in 2001 was estimated at 220.5 million kilowatt-hours. Consumption for that year was estimated at 205.1-kilowatt hours. An 88-megawatt electricity plant funded by Saudi Arabia, Kuwait, and Abu Dhabi was completed just south of Massawa in 2003, its completion delayed nearly three years by the war with Ethiopia. Annual consumption of petroleum in 2001 was estimated at 370,000 tons. Eritrea has no domestic petroleum production; the Eritrean Petroleum Corporation conducts purchases through international competitive tender. According to the U.S. Department of Commerce, opportunities exist for both on- and offshore oil and natural gas exploration; however, these prospects have yet to come to fruition. The use of Wind energy and solar power have slightly increased, due to the growth of solar power manufacturing companies in the country. The Eritrean government has expressed interest in developing alternative energy sources, including geothermal, solar, and wind power.

Services
In 2011, services accounted for 55 percent of gross domestic product. Financial services, the bulk of the services sector, are principally rendered by the National Bank of Eritrea (the nation's central bank), the Commercial Bank of Eritrea, the Housing and Commerce Bank of Eritrea, the Agricultural and Industrial Bank of Eritrea, the Eritrean Investment and Development Bank, and the National Insurance Corporation of Eritrea.

Tourism

Eritrea's lack of access to funds, the presence of large numbers of land mines, and the continued tensions that flare up between Eritrea and Ethiopia have deterred the development of a tourist industry in Eritrea. According to the World Tourism Organization, international tourism receipts in 2002 were only US$73 million.

Banking and Finance

According to the International Monetary Fund, commercial banks in Eritrea—all government owned and operated—appear to be in compliance with prudent regulations. Although the commercial banking sector is largely profitable, mostly owing to income from foreign exchange transactions, the sector is burdened by a high proportion of non-performing loans. Core lending activities do not generate sufficient income to cover operating costs at most commercial banks.

Labor force
Agriculture employs about 80 percent of the population in Eritrea, and the remaining 20 percent are employed in industry and services. The GDP per capita at nominal value was $475 in 2011.

Currency, exchange rate, and inflation

The official currency is the Eritrean nakfa (ERN), introduced in November 1997. In early 2005, likely in an effort to increase foreign capital reserves, the Eritrean government decreed that all transactions in Eritrea must be conducted in nakfa. It soon became illegal for individuals to hold and exchange foreign currency. As of January 1, 2005, the government set the foreign exchange rate at US$1=ERN15.

Inflation continues to be a problem in Eritrea, particularly as years of drought push grain prices higher and defense expenditures remain high. The International Monetary Fund estimates that in 2003 (the most recent year for which figures are available) average inflation reached 23 percent.

Government budget
Eritrea does not publish a budget, making its fiscal condition difficult to assess. According to the International Monetary Fund, the overall fiscal deficit in 2003 was 17 percent of gross domestic product (GDP). Government expenditures for that year were estimated to be US$375 million, with revenues of only US$235.7 million. In 2002 the fiscal deficit was 32 percent of GDP. Current expenditures continue to exceed budgeted spending, particularly in defense and other discretionary expenditures. Monetary policy remains subservient to the financing demands of the government, and debt is unsustainably high. This situation is not likely to change until demobilization of the military occurs. According to the CIA World Factbook, the Eritrean Government has revenues of $715.2 million, and outlays of $1.021 billion.

Foreign economic relations
China, India, South Korea, Italy, South Africa, and Germany are aggressively pursuing market opportunities in Eritrea. There is growing interest in U.S. products and services in Eritrea, although U.S. investment in Eritrea is still small.

In 2011, Eritrea imported goods worth US$899.9 million, including machinery, petroleum products, food, and manufactured goods. Eritrea's main suppliers were Brazil, China, Egypt, India, Italy, Germany, Saudi Arabia, and South Africa. In 2011 exports from Eritrea were valued at US$415.4 million, and the bulk were food, livestock, small manufactures, sorghum, and textiles. The major markets for Eritrean goods were China, Egypt, Italy, Saudi Arabia, Sudan, and the UK. More recently, fish, flowers, and salt have joined the list of exports.

Foreign investment is hindered by government regulations that seek to protect domestic industries from foreign competition and by a generally unfavorable investment climate. Major foreign investors in Eritrea include China, South Korea, Italy, South Africa, and Germany, as well as the World Bank.

The government prefers private-sector investment to official aid programs and declines foreign aid; therefore its relations with aid-dispensing nations and international institutions have often been difficult.

See also

Eritrea
Banking in Eritrea
List of companies based in Eritrea
 United Nations Economic Commission for Africa

References

External links

Eritrea latest trade data on ITC Trade Map
IMF Executive Board Concludes Consultation with Eritrea February 2005

 
Eritrea